Pamela Kathleen Moran is a fictional character from the television series Army Wives, which airs on Lifetime in the United States. The character was created by series' producer Katherine Fugate and is portrayed by actress Brigid Brannagh from the first through sixth seasons.

Storylines
Pamela comes from a family of police officers and firefighters and was a cop with Boston PD for three years. She left it to marry Chase and became a full-time housewife. The couple have two children Katie and Lucas, who were born while Chase was deployed. It is stated in Season 4 that they have been married for thirteen years.

Due to an ever amounting debt, Pamela becomes a paid surrogate mother, for which she received $50,000. Much of the surrogacy is kept a secret between Pamela and Chase due to pride. However, because of a premature birth of the twins, the secret comes out to an additional few, which leads to a bond between fellow military spouses Claudia Joy Holden, Roxy LeBlanc, Dr. Roland Burton and Denise Sherwood. Pamela later becomes more comfortable talking about it and reveals the surrogacy to her children and to the rest of the post.

Pamela is offered a job for the radio of the post but is later victim of stalking when a listener becomes obsessed with her. She also becomes the football coach.

Throughout the first seasons, Pamela struggles with the constant absences of Chase due to his commitments to Delta Force and the secrecy of his deployments. This comes to a high when she asks him to quit Delta Force because he always prioritizes his career over their family. Since he refuses, they divorce in the fourth season. This causes her to move away from the post and she returns to her original occupation as a police officer to provide for her children. At the end of the fourth season, Chase announces to Pamela that he is ready to quit Delta Force and tells her that he wants to be with her again. Also she receives a job offer as detective in Atlanta. In the beginning of the fifth season, Pamela is really struggling to make a decision, her partner invites her on a date and later kisses her. Pamela rekindles her relationship with Chase later in the fifth season and they later remarry in the Hump Bar. At the end of the season, Chase receives a job offer in California which promises a better pay than his and Pamela's current salaries combined. Chase accepts the offer and moves there alone so that the children can finish their school year in Charleston. However, after their house gets damaged by a hurricane and because the children miss Chase, she decides to go to California.

Characterization

Describing her character, Brannagh said "Pamela is an ex cop married to a sergeant in Delta force. Which is definitely different than my life. But Pamela is a very straight forward person, and I would say that am very much straight forward, and she certainly follows her conscience and so do I, but we have a few differences as well. I love to cook – she does not. And I like a very clean house, and if you saw the set this is clearly not Pamela’s priority." and that "she’s really down to earth and a little acerbic". Reflecting on her character's development, she said: "Pamela started out a little more cranky and dry but has softened as a byproduct of her friendship with the other women.

Reception

Baseguide, a military spouse magazine, wrote: "Brannagh brings to the role a deep-felt appreciation and growing empathy for the nation’s military members and their families."

References

External links
 Pamela Moran at Lifetime

Army Wives characters
Television characters introduced in 2007
Fictional characters from Boston
Fictional American police officers
American female characters in television